Sylvia Rhone (born March 11, 1952) is an American music industry executive. Since 2019, she is the chair and CEO of Epic Records, a label owned by Sony Music Entertainment.

Rhone served previously in senior positions at Vested In Culture, Universal Motown, Elektra Entertainment Group, and Atlantic Records.

In October 2004, Rhone was appointed president of Motown Records and executive vice president of Universal Records. Prior to her Universal Motown role, Rhone served as chairwoman and CEO of the Elektra Entertainment Group.  Rhone's appointment in 1994 as chairwoman and CEO of EEG established her as the only African American and the first woman in the history of the recording industry to attain such a title.

Early life and education
Born in Philadelphia, Pennsylvania on March 11, 1952, and raised in Harlem, New York, Rhone has cited her early exposure to seminal R&B shows at the Apollo Theatre as pivotal to her belief in music as an inspirational force. She cited influences in R&B such as Aretha Franklin and Ella Fitzgerald. In addition to R&B, Rhone also enjoyed rock music through artists like Jimi Hendrix and Janis Joplin. Accepted at the Wharton School at the University of Pennsylvania, Rhone graduated with a B.S. in Economics.

Career
Rhone got a job at Bankers Trust in New York City soon after graduating college, but she pursued her passion for music by landing a job as a secretary for Buddha Records in 1974. In a succession of promotions over the next six years, she also held positions at ABC Records and Ariola Records. Rhone was previously part of the Elektra family in 1980 as northeast regional promotion manager for special markets, and she was eventually promoted to director of national black music marketing for Atlantic Records.

Atlantic Records

Credited with helping to realign Atlantic's black music business, Rhone took on broader responsibilities in A&R and marketing in 1986 with her promotion to senior vice president and general manager of Atlantic Records. At Atlantic, Rhone managed such artists as En Vogue, the System, Levert, Brandy, Yo Yo, the D.O.C., MC Lyte, Chuckii Booker, Miki Howard, Gerald Albright and the Rude Boys and Chris Bender (singer). It was under her watch that Billboard magazine named Atlantic the #1 Black Music Division in 1988.

Rhone's career has been highlighted by multiple firsts: In 1990 she became the first African American woman to head a major record company when she was named CEO and president of Atlantic's EastWest Records America division. A year later when the EastWest artist roster and operations were combined with those of Atco Records, Rhone was named chairwoman and CEO of Atco/EastWest and subsequently of EastWest Records America.

At EastWest, she was directly involved in introducing several newcomers as well as helping established stars gain new success, including En Vogue, Gerald Levert, Pantera and Das EFX. She also played a role in furthering the careers of AC/DC and Simply Red, who eventually became EEG artists. Atlantic Records' founder Ahmet Ertegun commented on Rhone's success during the period, calling her administration one of "innovation, imagination, and freshness."

In 1993, she was cited by Ebony magazine as one of the top up-and-coming black executives in the entertainment industry.

Elektra Entertainment Group

In July 1994, Rhone was hired by Warner Music Group chairman Doug Morris to become chairwoman and CEO of the Elektra Entertainment Group.  The Los Angeles Times called Rhone "the most powerful woman in the music business", citing her as the only African American and the first woman in the history of the recording industry to attain the dual title.
 
Rhone guided the merger of Elektra, EastWest (of which she was formerly CEO) and Sire Records into one of the Warner Music Group's most diverse and competitive labels. Rhone was directly involved in the launch and guidance of multiple best-selling artists, including Missy Elliott, Busta Rhymes, Tracy Chapman, Yolanda Adams, Metallica, Natalie Merchant, Gerald Levert, Ol' Dirty Bastard, Fabolous, Jason Mraz, and Third Eye Blind, among others.

Motown and Universal Motown Records

In 2004, Rhone was appointed president of Motown Records, executive vice president of Universal Records, with chairman of Universal Music Group, Doug Morris, calling her "a rainmaker", and Universal Motown Record Group chairman Mel Lewinter citing Rhone as a "natural to lead Motown's evolution into the future". Under Rhone's stewardship, Motown reinvigorated both roster and staff, re-tooling the label into one of the savvier digital music business platforms. Rhone added Akon, India.Arie, Erykah Badu, Lil Wayne, Chamillionaire and others to the label.

In February 2006, the Universal Music label split into two labels, Universal Republic Records and Universal Motown Records, with Rhone serving as president of the latter.  Rhone's approach helped to raise the global identity of Cash Money Records, while also placing an increased emphasis on Universal Motown artists' connecting with fans via micro-blogging and social network platforms.

Rhone passed up on signing Drake; later he would sign a distribution deal with Universal for one of the largest advances to an unsigned artist in history.

Rhone stepped down from being president of the company in 2011.

Sony Music Entertainment/Epic and Vested In Culture 
In 2012, Rhone became CEO of her self-established label Vested In Culture, which was distributed through Epic Records.  In 2014, Rhone was named President of Epic Records, where she has overseen the release of projects including Travis Scott's No. 1 album Astroworld; Camila Cabello's #1 debut album Camila and the smash single "Havana," which was recently named the biggest single of 2018 by the IFPI. Since 2017, Rhone has been the head of Epic Records' operations.

Rhone was named Chairwoman and CEO of Epic Records in 2019. Under Rhone's leadership, the label has placed three artists simultaneously in the Top 10 of the Billboard 200 Albums chart twice, with Travis Scott's album Astroworld debuting at the top spot and returning to No. 1 again at the end of 2018. Rhone has guided multiple artists to the top of the charts at Epic Records, including Travis Scott, Camila Cabello, 21 Savage, Future, DJ Khaled, French Montana, Meghan Trainor and others.

She has also been recognized for bringing unprecedented hip hop success to the label and projects from Future, 21 Savage, and others.

Honors and awards

Rhone was ranked No. 35 on Billboard's Annual Power 100 List in 2019.

Rhone picked up the City Of Hope's Spirit Of Life Award in October, 2019, with former U.S. Attorney General Eric Holder presenting the award to Ms. Rhone.

Rhone received the Midem 2019 Hall Of Fame Award, in association with Billboard, at their 53rd annual conference in June, 2019, where Rhone gave the Keynote address.

Rhone received an honorary doctorate from the Berklee College of Music in April, 2019.

In 2019 Rhone was profiled in Variety.

2018 Rhone was profiled in Billboard Magazine as "Sony Music's Most powerful African-American Woman."

In 2018, Rhone received the Culture Creators Icon Award, where Rhone stated in her acceptance speech "Our one common goal is to protect the culture."

Rhone is a member of the board of directors of the Rock and Roll Hall of Fame.

References

African-American businesspeople
American music industry executives
Living people
1952 births
American women in business
21st-century African-American people
21st-century African-American women
20th-century African-American people
20th-century African-American women